The 2023 Vilnius summit of NATO heads was planned at the 2022 Madrid summit. Its dates were fixed on 9 November 2022 for 11–12 July 2023.

Background
In his January 2023 address to the Lithuanian Parliament, Ukrainian President Volodymyr Zelensky saw the summit as fateful.

As late as February 2023, both Sweden and Finland were hoping that Hungary and Turkey would do the necessary to admit them to membership. A Turkish writer foresaw admission before the Vilnius summit but "realistically after" the 2023 Turkish general election, which at the time was scheduled to take place on 18 June 2023.

References

2023 conferences
2023 in international relations
21st-century diplomatic conferences (NATO)
Lithuania and NATO
Diplomatic conferences in Lithuania
June 2023 events in Europe
NATO summits
July 2023 events in Lithuania